is a railway station in Fukushima-ku, Osaka, Osaka Prefecture, Japan.

Line
West Japan Railway Company (JR West)
JR Tōzai Line
Stations and rail lines near Shin-Fukushima Station
JR West Osaka Loop Line: Fukushima Station (no connection)
Hanshin Railway Main Line: Fukushima Station
Keihan Railway Nakanoshima Line: Nakanoshima Station

Layout
There is an island platform with two tracks on the second floor below ground.

History 
Shin-Fukushima Station opened on 8 March 1997, coinciding with the opening of the JR Tōzai Line between Kyobashi and Amagasaki.

Station numbering was introduced in March 2018 with Shin-Fukushima being assigned station number JR-H45.

Adjacent stations

References 

Fukushima-ku, Osaka
Railway stations in Osaka